Venango Township is a township in Butler County, Pennsylvania, United States. The population was 868 at the 2010 census.

Geography
Venango Township is located along the northern edge of Butler County. It is bordered by the borough of Cherry Valley to the east, the borough of Eau Claire to the east and north, Allegheny Township to the east, Parker Township at the southeastern corner, Washington Township to the south, Cherry Township at the southwestern corner, and Marion Township to the west. To the north, in Venango County, are Clinton and Scrubgrass townships.

Demographics

As of the census of 2000, there were 732 people, 277 households, and 216 families living in the township.  The population density was 35.3 people per square mile (13.6/km2).  There were 348 housing units at an average density of 16.8/sq mi (6.5/km2).  The racial makeup of the township was 99.04% White, 0.14% Native American, 0.14% Pacific Islander, and 0.55% from two or more races. Hispanic or Latino of any race were 0.27% of the population.

There were 277 households, out of which 35.4% had children under the age of 18 living with them, 65.7% were married couples living together, 5.4% had a female householder with no husband present, and 21.7% were non-families. 18.4% of all households were made up of individuals, and 6.9% had someone living alone who was 65 years of age or older.  The average household size was 2.60 and the average family size was 2.94.

In the township the population was spread out, with 25.7% under the age of 18, 6.7% from 18 to 24, 29.2% from 25 to 44, 25.1% from 45 to 64, and 13.3% who were 65 years of age or older.  The median age was 38 years. For every 100 females there were 119.2 males.  For every 100 females age 18 and over, there were 114.2 males.

The median income for a household in the township was $34,107, and the median income for a family was $38,214. Males had a median income of $30,938 versus $20,694 for females. The per capita income for the township was $14,600.  About 10.0% of families and 11.6% of the population were below the poverty line, including 9.9% of those under age 18 and 15.7% of those age 65 or over.

References

Populated places established in 1797
Townships in Butler County, Pennsylvania